Komasij (also Romanized as Komāsīj; also known as Kamāsaj and Kamāsej) is a village in Efzar Rural District, Efzar District, Qir and Karzin County, Fars Province, Iran. At the 2006 census, its population was 292, in 60 families.

References 

Populated places in Qir and Karzin County